The Century Spire is a 60-story tall mixed-used skyscraper under construction in Makati, Metro Manila, Philippines and is part of the Century City development.

Architecture
The Century Spire was designed by Daniel Libeskind of Studio Daniel Libeskind. The interior design was done by Armani/Casa Interior Design Studio of Giorgio Armani. The glass-clad tower is divided into three branch with varying heights. Between the two highest tower shafts is a diagonal glass structure was placed by Libeskind which includes penthouses. The lower third floors of the tower are for office use and the upper floors are residential. Underground parking will also be present and two floors of the building are also allotted for amenities for residents.

Construction
The groundbreaking for the building was held in May 2014.

References

External links

Skyscraper office buildings in Metro Manila
Residential skyscrapers in Metro Manila
Skyscrapers in Makati
Daniel Libeskind buildings
Buildings and structures under construction in Metro Manila